Bondi Beach is a popular beach and the name of the surrounding suburb in Sydney, New South Wales, Australia. It has a population of 11,656 residents. Its postcode is 2026. Bondi, North Bondi, and Bondi Junction are neighboring suburbs. Bondi Beach is one of the most visited tourist sites in Australia.

History 

"Bondi," originally "Boondi" is an Aboriginal word which has the same meaning as the word "surf" in English. The first record of "bondi" by European-ancestry Australians was made between 1899 and 1903. It describes the meaning as "noise made by sea waves breaking on the beach," which is essentially the definition of "surf" in contemporary American English. The Australian Museum records that Bondi means place where a fight using bondi sticks (nulla nullas or fighting sticks) took place.

In 1809 the road builder William Roberts received a grant of land in the area. In 1851 Edward Smith Hall and Francis O'Brien purchased  of the Bondi area that included most of the beach frontage, which was named "The Bondi Estate." Hall was O'Brien's father-in-law. Between 1855 and 1877 O'Brien purchased his father-in-law's share of the land, renamed the land the "O'Brien Estate," and made the beach and the surrounding land available to the public as a picnic ground and amusement resort. As the beach became increasingly popular, O'Brien threatened to stop public beach access. However, the Municipal Council believed that the Government needed to intervene to make the beach a public reserve. In mid-1882, Bondi Beach became a public beach. The first tramway to the beach was established in 1884. The Waverley Council was responsible for building the first surf bathing sheds on the beach in 1903. By 1929 an estimated 60,000 people were visiting the beach on a summer weekend day. The opening of the pavilion in the same year attracted a huge crowd of 200,000.  

On 6 February 1938 five people drowned and over 250 people were rescued or resuscitated after a series of large waves struck the beach and pulled people back into the sea, a day that became known as "Black Sunday".

Bondi Beach was a working class suburb throughout most of the twentieth century with migrant people from New Zealand comprising the majority of the local population. Following World War II, Bondi Beach and the Eastern Suburbs became home for Jewish migrants from Poland, Russia, Hungary, Czechoslovakia and Germany. A stream of Jewish immigration continued into the 21st century and the area has a number of synagogues and a kosher butcher. 
The multicultural migration funded and drove the growth of the suburb throughout the 1990s into the turn of the century, moving it steadily from its working-class roots towards an upper/middle-class enclave similar to its neighbors of Rose Bay and Bellevue Hill which was listed as the most expensive postcode in the country from 2003 to 2005.

Bondi Beach was long a center for efforts to fight indecency in beach attire.  The beach was a focal point of the 1907 Sydney bathing costume protests, organized to oppose proposed dress standards for beachgoers.  The Local Government Act, Ordinance No. 52 (1935) governed the decency of swimming costumes and was in force between 1935 and 1961, and resulted in public controversy as the two-piece "bikini" became popular after World War II. Waverley Council's beach inspectors, including the Aub Laidlaw, were responsible for enforcing the law and were required to measure the dimensions of swimwear and order offenders against public decency off the beach. While vacationing in Australia during 1951, American movie actress Jean Parker made international headlines when she was escorted off the beach after Laidlaw determined her bikini was too skimpy. The rule became increasingly anachronistic during the 1950s and was replaced in 1961 with one requiring bathers be "clad in a proper and adequate bathing costume", allowing for more subjective judgement of decency. By the 1980s topless bathing had become common at Bondi Beach, especially at the southern end.

Sydney's Water Board maintained an untreated sewage outlet not far from the north end of the beach until the 1960s when a sewage treatment plant was built. In the mid-1990s the plant was upgraded & a deepwater ocean outfall was completed to meet water quality standards.

In March 2007, Waverley Council started proceedings to evict a hermit who was living in squalor on a cliff overlooking the beach. Peter James Paul Millhouse, calling himself Jhyimy "Two Hats" Mhiyles, came to the beach during the 2000 Sydney Olympic Games and became a local celebrity for his lifestyle and poetry recitals to visitors. Residents and tourists put together a "save the caveman" petition to allow him to continue residing but under certain rules. In 2009, he was arrested and charged for the rape of a tourist. While he was in custody, Waverley Council under then-mayor Liberal Sally Betts removed his belongings from the cliff. In September 2011, charges against Jhyimy were dropped by the Director of Public Prosecutions over concerns of the reliability of the witness. Waverley Council has not offered recompense for his eviction from his home or loss of belongings.

In March 2020, the NSW Government closed Bondi Beach after a number of people there exceeded Australia's outdoor-gathering limit imposed to slow the spread of the coronavirus in New South Wales.

Heritage listings 
Bondi Beach has a number of heritage-listed sites, including:

 20 Hall Street: Bondi Beach Post Office
 Queen Elizabeth Drive: Bondi Beach Cultural Landscape

Bondi Beach was added to the Australian National Heritage List in 2008.

Overview

Surf Life Saving Australia gave different hazard ratings to areas of Bondi Beach in 2004. While the northern end has been rated a gentle 4 (with 10 as the most hazardous), the southern side is rated as a 7 due to a famous rip current known as the "Backpackers' Rip" because of its proximity to the bus stop, the fact that many backpackers and tourists do not realise that the flat, smooth water is a rip, and quite dangerous, and the unwillingness of tourists to walk the length of the beach to safer swimming. The south end of the beach is generally reserved for surfboard riding. Yellow and red flags define safe swimming areas, and visitors are advised to swim between them.

There is an underwater shark net; however, it does not stretch the entire beach, it is made up of overlapping sections. Many other beaches along the same stretch of the coast have similar shark nets. Pods of whales and dolphins have been sighted in the bay during the months of migration (March–May, September–November). Fairy penguins, while uncommon, are sometimes also seen swimming close to shore or amongst surfers in southern line-up.

In 2007, the Guinness World Record for the largest swimsuit photo shoot was set at Bondi Beach, with 1,010 women wearing bikinis taking part.

In 2011, Waverley Council implemented Wi-Fi to Bondi Beach users. Service is free with limits on access periods and downloads per use. The cost of setup was estimated to be between $34,000 and $50,000 with annual costs of $25,000. Local business as well as The Bondi Chamber of Commerce supported the notion as locals and visitors are able to connect with local business, events and other community and council events. In 2012 Mayor of Waverley Sally Betts said that for the 2 million visitors annually, Wi-Fi offers access to local events and business information.

Sport and recreation
Bondi Beach is represented in one of the most popular sporting competitions across Australia, the National Rugby League competition, by the local team the Sydney Roosters, officially the Eastern Suburbs District Rugby League Football Club (ESDRLFC).

Bondi Beach is the end point of the City to Surf Fun Run which is held each year in August. The race attracts over 63,000 entrants who complete the  run from the Sydney central business district to Bondi Beach. Other annual activities at Bondi Beach include Flickerfest, Australia's premier international short film festival in January, World Environment Day in June, Sculpture by the Sea in November, and the Winter Magic Festival that attracted 60,000 visitors in 2016. In addition to many activities, the Bondi Beach Markets is open every Sunday, and a food market every Saturday, at Bondi Beach Public School. Many Irish and British tourists spend Christmas Day at the beach.

An Oceanway connects Bondi to South Head to the north and other beaches to the south up to Coogee.

Bondi Beach hosted the beach volleyball competition at the 2000 Summer Olympics. A temporary 10,000-seat stadium, a much smaller stadium, 2 warm-up courts, and 3 training courts were set up to host the tournament.

Lifesaving clubs

Bondi Surf Bathers' Life Saving Club claims to be the world's first surf lifesaving club, and North Bondi Surf Life Saving Club is a federation club. Both clubs were founded in 1907. Bondi members invented the surf reel and many other icons of lifesaving. Surf lifesavers from both clubs were involved in the largest rescue ever on a single day, known as 'Black Sunday'. Bondi holds the most Australian Surf Lifesaving Championship gold medals in R&R (rescue & resuscitation) and North Bondi holds the most gold medals in March Past.

Bondi Icebergs

The Bondi Icebergs Swimming Club origin dates back to 1929 and owes its origins to the desire of a band of dedicated local lifesavers who wished to maintain their fitness during the winter months. They formed the Bondi Icebergs Winter Swimming Club and drew up a constitution and elected office bearers. Included in the constitution was a rule that to maintain membership it was mandatory that swimmers compete on three Sundays out of four for a period of five years.

Bondi Skate Park 
The Bondi Skate Park opened to the public in 1991 with only two skate ramps. In 2004, the council sought consultation with the skating community for input on how best to upgrade the site. The bowl was designed by Chad Ford and built by the company Zalem. The park has been hosting BOWL-A-RAMA, an international skating competition, since 2004;.

Commercial area

Bondi Beach has a commercial area along Campbell Parade and adjacent side streets, featuring many popular cafes, restaurants, and hotels, with views of the beach. Pacific Bondi Beach is a shopping centre that features Woolworths Metro, QT Hotel and 22 stores. It was built on the old Swiss Grand Hotel. 

The Hotel Bondi is a landmark on Campbell Parade. It was built from 1915 to the 1920s and was designed by E. Lindsay Thompson. It combines Italianate, Federation and Free Classical elements and has been described as an "important landmark building in the Bondi Beach townscape." It has a state heritage listing. The Beach Road Hotel, originally opened in 1956 and was formerly The Regis and prior to that The Rex, is on the corner of Glenayr Avenue and Beach Road.

Bondi Pavilion is a community cultural centre, located right on Bondi Beach, which features a theatre, gallery, rehearsal, meeting and function rooms, art workshop, and studios. Bondi Pavilion is the centre for major festivals performances throughout the year. It has a state heritage listing.

Culture and events
Numerous festivals and events such as the annual Miss Bondi beauty pageant have made Bondi Beach a popular destination among travellers. The beach has long captured the attention of poets including Les Murray, Joanne Burns and Brook Emery. The Vans Bowl-A-Rama skateboarding competition is held at the skate bowl in February every year.

In popular culture

Bondi Beach has been used as a location for numerous films, television series, music videos, and a video game:

 The Block was an Australian home renovation television series; its first season was filmed at Bondi Beach in 2003.
 Being Lara Bingle was a reality television series that followed model Lara Bingle and was set in Bondi.
 Deep Water was a 2016 mini-series set on Bondi Beach which was loosely based on a series of bashings and murders of 30-80 gay men in the late 1980s and early 1990s.  A documentary, Deep Water:The Real Story was broadcast along with the fictionalized mini-series.
 Bondi Rescue is a factual television series about the team of lifeguards who patrol the beach.  
 Bondi Vet is a factual television series based on veterinarian Chris Brown.
 Breakers was a television drama series filmed around Bondi Beach.
 The video game Tony Hawk's Underground 2s Level Australia is based on Bondi Beach.
 Les Norton, a popular Australian fictional character who stars in the Robert G. Barrett series of books, "lives" at Bondi in the stories.
 People Under the Stairs, an American hip hop duo, filmed part of the video for their song "The Wiz" on Bondi Beach.
 Scooby-Doo! and the Legend of the Vampire, an American animated movie, included scenes set at Bondi Beach.
 Two Hands (1999 film), starring Heath Ledger.
 The 1959 film version of Summer of the Seventeenth Doll featured the characters drinking beer at the Bondi Iceberg's Club.
 The 1966 film They're a Weird Mob features a scene in which the star is rescued on Bondi Beach.
 The Endless Summer Music Festival
 Bondi Beach was featured in the Modern Family episode "Australia", which aired on U.S. television on 23 April 2014.
 In Top of the Lake Series 2, Robin investigates a case opened when a suitcase containing a woman's body washes up on Bondi Beach.
 In Season 3, Episode 12 of Lost a Bondi Beach t-shirt is used as swaddling for a baby, implying that one of the passengers on ill-fated Oceanic Airlines Flight 815 (which originated in Sydney, Australia) had been to Bondi Beach.
In the 1930s and 40s, members of Graham Men's Gymnastics Club entertained beachgoers with acrobatics on the sand. The word "beachobatics" was coined.

Population

Demographics
Bondi Beach is often considered to be one of Sydney's most densely populated suburbs, with a population density of 10188/km2 in 2011.
According to the 2016 census of Population, there were 11,656 residents in Bondi Beach. In Bondi Beach, 45.3% of people were born in Australia. The most common countries of birth were England 8.7%, New Zealand 3.4%, South Africa 2.3%, United States 2.0% and Brazil 2.0%. 64.8% of people only spoke English at home. Other languages spoken at home included Spanish 3.5%, French 2.4%, Portuguese 2.1%, Italian 1.9% and Russian 1.7%. The most common responses for religion in Bondi Beach were No Religion 41.2% and Catholic 18.9%.

Notable residents (past or present)
 Taylor Auerbach, journalist
 Rose Byrne, actress
 James Packer, businessman
 Michael Clarke, Australian cricketer
 Larry Emdur, TV presenter
 Steven Kilbey, bass guitarist of rock band The Church
 Ed Oxenbould, teen actor
 Darren Palmer, Interior Designer

Namesakes 
 "Bondi Beach" was the name of a wave pool at Carowinds Theme Park in Fort Mill, South Carolina, United States.
 Bondi blue is a blue-green colour, first named when used as the exterior colour of the original iMac personal computer introduced in 1998 and named after the colour of the water at Bondi Beach. 
Bondi Burgers, served at Oporto restaurants, are named as such due to Oporto's originating in North Bondi. There is a chain of pizzerias in Sydney called Bondi Pizza, as well as a tanning lotion called Bondi Sands.

See also 
 Australian landmarks
 Beaches in Sydney
 Bondi Beach Cultural Landscape
 Little Bondi, Northern Territory
 Venues of the 2000 Summer Olympics

References

Bibliography

External links 

  [CC-By-SA]
 Virtual tour of Bondi Beach

Suburbs of Sydney
Tourist attractions in Sydney
Venues of the 2000 Summer Olympics
Olympic volleyball venues
Australian National Heritage List
Surfing locations in New South Wales
Beaches of Sydney
 
Waverley Council
Beach volleyball venues